The 2019–20 ZZ Leiden season was the 14th season in the existence of the club. The club is known for sponsorship reasons as Zorg en Zekerheid Leiden. The club will play in the Dutch Basketball League (DBL) and NBB Cup. It will also play in the FIBA Europe Cup. 

In March, the DBL season was cancelled prematurely due to the COVID-19 pandemic.

Overview
On 5 July 2019, Leiden announced head coach Rolf Franke was returning for a second season.

Players

Squad information

Depth chart

Transactions

In 

|}

Out 

|}

Preseason

Dutch Basketball Supercup
As the winners of the 2018–19 NBB Cup, Leiden qualified for its sixth Supercup appearance.

Dutch Basketball League

Regular season

References

External links
 ZZ Leiden website

Leiden, ZZ
Leiden, ZZ
ZZ Leiden